Suzanne Basdevant Bastid (15 August 1906 – 2 March 1995) was a French professor of law who specialized in international public law.
She became a widely respected authority, lectured in many institutions, was for 30 years professor at the Faculty of Law of Paris (Paris II after 1971) and was a judge in the International Court of Justice. She was the first woman to become professor of Law in France and the first woman to be a member of the Institut de France, which is the most prestigious learned society of France.

Life

Suzanne Marie Berthe Basdevant was born in Rennes, Brittany, on 15 August 1906.
Her father was Jules Basdevant, a professor at the Rennes faculty of law. She was the oldest of seven children.
In 1918 the family moved to Paris, where Jules Basdevant taught public international law.
Suzanne studied at the Lyceé Fénelon in Paris, then began to study law.

Basdevant obtained a doctorate in law in 1930 for a thesis on international civil servants.
This was the first major work on this subject.
It has come to be viewed as a standard work.
She defined an international civil servant as a functionary appointed and directed by representatives of several states, or by an organization acting in their name following an inter-state agreement, who acts under special legal rules exclusively in the interests of these states.
Basdevant stated that the most appropriate basis for the contract between international public servants and the body that employs them is public administrative law.
This theory has since been upheld many times.

In 1932 Basdevant was third in the concours d'agrégation for public law, and the first woman to join the Faculty of Law.
She taught public international law and other subjects at the Lyon faculty of law from 1933 to 1946.
Basdevent married Paul Bastid in 1937, a professor on the Paris law faculty.
Bastid was Minister of Commerce at the time of their marriage.
They had three daughters and a son, who died.
She remained in Lyon during World War II (1939–45), and taught international law at the École Libre des Sciences Politiques, which had moved to Lyon from Paris.
During the German occupation her husband was a member of the National Council of the Resistance.

In 1946 Suzanne Bastid was appointed to the Faculty of Law of Paris (University of Paris) and has been there  a faculty member in international law until 1977–78 (Paris II from 1971), when she retired. She also gave lectures at the Paris Institute of Political Studies
She became well known as an authority on international law, and was invited to lecture in various leading institutions around the world.
She was a member of the Centre national de la recherche scientifique (CNRS) from 1948 to 1966 in the section of political and juridical studies. 
She founded the CNRS journal L'Annuaire français de droit internationale publique in 1955, and was the journal's chief editor.
Bastid stated in public that she was against the European Defence Community (EDC) treaty.
For this reason, she was replaced at the Stresa congress on the European Coal and Steel Community in May–June 1957 by René Roblot.

Bastid taught in New York and Beijing, and undertook missions in Egypt, Poland, Portugal, Uruguay, Morocco, Lebanon and Taiwan. 
She was a member of the French delegation to the General Assembly of the United Nations from 1949 to 1957. She sat on the administrative tribunal of the United Nations, and was a judge at the International Court of Justice in a dispute between Tunisia and Libya in 1982.
Paul Bastid died on 29 October 1974 at the age of 82.
Suzanne Bastid died in Paris on 2 March 1995 at the age of 88.

Publications

Notes

Sources

1906 births
1995 deaths
French jurists
20th-century jurists